Blagaj is a village in Croatia's Karlovac County, near the town of Slunj. According to the 2001 Croatian census, the village had 38 inhabitants.

References

Populated places in Karlovac County